In chemistry, the empirical formula of a chemical compound is the simplest whole number ratio of atoms present in a compound. A simple example of this concept is that the empirical formula of sulfur monoxide, or SO, would simply be SO, as is the empirical formula of disulfur dioxide, S2O2. Thus, sulfur monoxide and disulfur dioxide, both compounds of sulfur and oxygen, have the same empirical formula. However, their molecular formulas, which express the number of atoms in each molecule of a chemical compound, are not the same.

An empirical formula makes no mention of the arrangement or number of atoms. It is standard for many ionic compounds, like calcium chloride (CaCl2), and for macromolecules, such as silicon dioxide (SiO2).

The molecular formula, on the other hand, shows the number of each type of atom in a molecule. The structural formula shows the arrangement of the molecule. It is also possible for different types of compounds to have equal empirical formulas.

Samples are analyzed in specific elemental analysis tests to determine what percent of a particular element the sample is composed of.

Examples 

 Glucose, ribose, Acetic acid, and formaldehyde all have different molecular formulas but the same empirical formula: . This is the actual molecular formula for formaldehyde, but acetic acid has double the number of atoms, ribose has five times the number of atoms, and glucose has six times the number of atoms.
 The chemical compound n-hexane has the structural formula , which shows that it has 6 carbon atoms arranged in a chain, and 14 hydrogen atoms.

Calculation example
A chemical analysis of a sample of methyl acetate provides the following elemental data: 48.64% carbon (C), 8.16% hydrogen (H), and 43.20% oxygen (O). For the purposes of determining empirical formulas, it's assumed that we have 100 grams of the compound. If this is the case, the percentages will be equal to the mass of each element in grams.

Step 1: Change each percentage to an expression of the mass of each element in grams. That is, 48.64% C becomes 48.64 g C, 8.16% H becomes 8.16 g H, and 43.20% O becomes 43.20 g O.

Step 2: Convert the amount of each element in grams to its amount in moles

Step 3: Divide each of the resulting values by the smallest of these values (2.7)

Step 4: If necessary, multiply these numbers by integers in order to get whole numbers; if an operation is done to one of the numbers, it must be done to all of them.

This formula also happens to be methyl acetate's molecular formula.

References

Chemical formulas
Analytical chemistry